Hotel Sinestra is a 2022 Dutch family film directed by Michiel ten Horn. The film won the Golden Film award after having sold 100,000 tickets.

Elise Schaap, Jeroen Spitzenberger and Bobbie Mulder play lead roles in the film. Principal photography took place in early 2022. The film takes place at a hotel in Val Sinestra, a valley of the Swiss Alps.

References

External links 
 

2022 films
2020s Dutch-language films
Films directed by Michiel ten Horn
Dutch children's films
2020s children's films